The 1992 United States Senate election in Arkansas was held on November 3, 1992. Incumbent Democratic Senator Dale Bumpers won re-election to a fourth term. His Republican opponent was future Arkansas lieutenant governor, governor, and two-time presidential candidate Mike Huckabee, a church pastor from Texarkana.

The 1992 election coincided with the 1992 presidential election, in which Arkansas governor Bill Clinton, who was elected as President of the United States, won his home state. In contrast with Bumpers' landslide where he won over 60% of the vote, Clinton won only 53% of the vote. Bumpers would serve another term in the U.S. Senate before deciding to retire in 1998. , this would be the last time that Arkansas would vote for the Democratic candidates for both the presidential and Senate elections.

Major candidates

Democratic 
 Dale Bumpers, incumbent U.S. Senator and former Governor
 Julia Hughes Jones, State Auditor

Republican 
 Mike Huckabee, pastor
 David Busby, businessman

Results

See also
 1992 United States Senate elections
 2002 United States Senate election in Arkansas
 2008 United States Senate election in Arkansas

References

1992
1992 Arkansas elections
Arkansas
Mike Huckabee